Bust/waist/hip measurements (informally called 'body measurements' or ′vital statistics′) are a common method of specifying clothing sizes. They match the three inflection points of the female body shape. In human body measurement, these three sizes are the circumferences of the bust, waist and hips; usually rendered as xx–yy–zz in inches, or centimeters. The three sizes are used mostly in fashion, and almost exclusively in reference to women, who, compared to men, are more likely to have a narrow waist relative to bust and hips. An important difference exists when measuring men's hips for most fashion design purposes. In these instances, men's hips are measured at the genitals.

Measurements and perception
Breast volume will have an effect on the perception of a woman's figure even when bust/waist/hip measurements are nominally the same. Brassière band size is measured below the breasts, not at the bust. A woman with measurements of 36A–27–38 will have a different presentation than a woman with measurements of 34C–27–38. These women have ribcage circumferences differing by 2 inches, but when breast tissue is included the measurements are the same at 38 inches. The result is that the latter woman will appear "bustier" than the former due to the apparent difference in bust to hip ratios (narrower shoulders, more prominent breasts) even though they are both technically 38–27–38.

Height will also affect the presentation of the figure. Since the latter woman's figure has greater distance between measuring points, she will likely appear thinner than her former counterpart, again, even though they share the same measurements. 

The specific proportions of 36–24–36 inches (90-60-90 centimeters) have frequently been given as the "ideal", or "hourglass" proportions for women since at least the 1960s (these measurements are, for example, the title of a hit instrumental by The Shadows).

See also 
 Female body shape
 Physical attractiveness
Waist–hip ratio
 Waist-to-height ratio

References

Sizes in clothing
Body shape